Wikrowo may refer to the following places:
Wikrowo, Gmina Gronowo Elbląskie in Warmian-Masurian Voivodeship (north Poland)
Wikrowo, Gmina Pasłęk in Warmian-Masurian Voivodeship (north Poland)
Wikrowo, Kętrzyn County in Warmian-Masurian Voivodeship (north Poland)